Lynne Cohen (July 3, 1944 – May 12, 2014) was an American-Canadian photographer.

Life
Born in Racine, Wisconsin, Cohen was educated in printmaking and sculpture at the University of Wisconsin, Madison, Wisconsin, and in Ann Arbor and Eastern Michigan University, Ypsilanti, Michigan. She studied for a year at the Slade School of Fine Art in London, England.

Cohen lived and worked in Canada beginning in 1973, initially in Ottawa, and in Montreal from 2005 until 2014.

She taught at several institutions, primarily Eastern Michigan University (1968-1973), Algonquin College (1973-1975), and the University of Ottawa (1974-2005).

Cohen died of lung cancer at the age of 69 on May 12, 2014, in the palliative care unit at McGill University Health Centre in Montreal, Quebec, Canada. In accordance with her personal wishes, no funeral service was held.

Work 
Cohen was known for her photographs of empty institutional interiors: living rooms, public halls, retirement homes, laboratories, offices, showrooms, shooting ranges, factories, spas, and military installations. Despite this interest in living and working spaces, Cohen's photographs are usually devoid of human presence.  She photographed using an 8 x 10" view camera, allowing her to capture great detail, and create very large prints beginning in the mid-eighties. Her work has been published in catalogues such as Occupied Territory (1987) and No Man's Land (2001). In one of her last monographs, Cohen described a major goal in her work, a "long-standing preoccupation with formal, intellectual and ideological camouflage."

Exhibitions
Cohen's work has been featured in well over 100 solo exhibitions, as well as numerous two- and three-person exhibitions.

Solo exhibitions of her work have been held in Canada at the National Gallery of Canada; Art Gallery of Ontario, Toronto;McCord Museum, Montreal; Design Exchange, Toronto; Musée d’art contemporain de Montréal; and Presentation House Gallery, Vancouver; as well as internationally at the Museum für Gestaltung, Zurich; Chinati Foundation, Marfa, Texas; FRAC, Limousin, Limoges; Museum voor Fotografie, Antwerp; Centro de Fotografía, Salamanca; Musée de l'Elysée, Lausanne; Image/Imatge, Orthez, France; Museum für Photographie, Braunschweig; Fototeca, Havana; Le Point du Jour, Cherbourg-Octeville; Fundació Mapfre, Madrid, Córdoba; Bilbao, Museum of Contemporary Art; UMass, Amherst; and at the Centro de la Imagen, Mexico City. Since her death, other substantial shows of her work have been mounted at Kitchener-Waterloo Art Gallery, Ontario, Winnipeg Art Gallery, Ottawa Art Gallery, Museo Universidad de Navarra, Pamplona, and the Burnaby Art Gallery.

Awards 
Cohen was the recipient of numerous awards and prizes for her work. In 2005, Cohen was the recipient of the Governor General's Award in Visual and Media Arts. She was nominated for the Grange Prize, Art Gallery of Ontario, Toronto in 2009. In 2011, she was the recipient of the inaugural Scotiabank Photography Award.

Public collections 
Cohen's work is represented in the collections of over 50 public institutions. In Canada these include the National Gallery of Canada; the Art Museum at the University of Toronto; Art Gallery of Ontario; Canada Council Art Bank; Musée d'art contemporain de Montréal; Musée national des beaux-arts du Québec; Canadian Centre for Architecture, Montreal; and the Walter Phillips Gallery, Banff. Internationally, her work is held in the collections of the Bibliothèque Nationale, Paris; Kunsthaus Zurich; New Orleans Museum of Art, New Orleans; Center for Creative Photography, Tucson; Centre Georges Pompidou, Paris; Museo Universidad de Navarra, Pamplona; George Eastman Museum, Rochester, New York; Museum Folkwang, Essen;  the Princeton University Art Museum; and the Tate Modern, amongst others.

References

Bibliography

Cohen, Lynne and Francois Tourneux. Faux Indices. Montréal: Musée d'Art Contemporain, 2013.
Cohen, Lynne. Almas Gemelas, Museo Universidad de Navarra, Pamplona, 2012.
Cohen, Lynne. Occupied Territory. New York: Aperture, 2012.
Cohen, Lynne and Marie de Brugerolle.  Lynne Cohen. Montréal: Dazibao, 2011.
Cohen, Lynne. Cover, Le Point du Jour, Paris/Cherbourg, 2009.
Cohen, Lynne. Camouflage. Cherbourg: Point du jour, 2005.
Thomas, Ann. No Man's Land: The Photography of Lynne Cohen". Thames & Hudson, 2001. 
Cohen, Lynne, Fonds Regional d'Art Contemporain de Limousin, Hôtel des Arts. 
Cohen, Lynne. Lynne Cohen: l'endroit du decor = lost and found. Paris: Hôtel des Arts, 1992.
Lamoureux, Johanne. Stages Without Wings, Art Gallery of York University,1992
de Duve, Thierry. Lynne Cohen. Brussels: Edition Galerie Gokelaere & Janssen, 1990.

External links 

Olga Korper Gallery
Library and Archives Canada - Celebrating Women's Achievements
Centre national des arts plastiques, France
Florida Museum of Photographic Arts - The Art of Lynne Cohen archived at 
Lynne Cohen fonds at the National Gallery of Canada, Ottawa, Ontario

1944 births
2014 deaths
American photographers
Canadian photographers
Canadian women photographers
American expatriates in Canada
People from Racine, Wisconsin
Artists from Montreal
Canadian women artists
Deaths from lung cancer
Eastern Michigan University faculty
Academic staff of the University of Ottawa
University of Wisconsin–Madison alumni
Eastern Michigan University alumni
Artists from Wisconsin
Governor General's Award in Visual and Media Arts winners
20th-century American women photographers
20th-century American photographers
American women academics
21st-century American women